The Gordon E. Sawyer Award is an Honorary Award given by the Academy of Motion Picture Arts and Sciences to "an individual in the motion picture industry whose technological contributions have brought credit to the industry." The award is named in honour of Gordon E. Sawyer, the former Sound Director at Samuel Goldwyn Studio and three-time Academy Award winner who claimed that a listing of past Academy Awards, arranged both chronologically and by category, represents a history of the development of motion pictures. It was first presented at the 54th Academy Awards, in April 1982. The Gordon E. Sawyer Award is voted upon and given by the Scientific and Technical Awards Committee of the Academy.

Recipients

 1981 (54th) Joseph Walker
 1982 (55th) John O. Aalberg
 1983 (56th) Dr. John G. Frayne
 1984 (57th) Linwood G. Dunn
 1987 (60th) Fred Hynes
 1988 (61st) Gordon Henry Cook
 1989 (62nd) Pierre Angénieux
 1990 (63rd) Stefan Kudelski
 1991 (64th) Ray Harryhausen
 1992 (65th) Erich Kästner
 1993 (66th) Petro Vlahos
 1995 (68th) Donald C. Rogers
 1997 (70th) Don Iwerks
 1999 (72nd) Dr. Roderick T. Ryan
 2000 (73rd) Irwin Young
 2001 (74th) Edmund DiGiulio
 2003 (76th) Peter D. Parks
 2004 (77th) Takuo Miyagishima
 2005 (78th) Gary Demos
 2006 (79th) Ray Feeney
 2007 (80th) David Grafton
 2008 (81st) Edwin Catmull
 2011 (84th) Douglas Trumbull
 2013 (86th) Peter W. Anderson
 2014 (87th) David W. Gray
 2017 (90th) Jonathan Erland

References

External links
 Academy Awards – Gordon E. Sawyer Award

Sawyer, Gordon E.
American science and technology awards